This is a list of the various animated cartoons featuring Bugs Bunny. He starred in over 160 theatrical animated short films of the Looney Tunes and Merrie Melodies series produced by Warner Bros. Cartoons and distributed by Warner Bros. Pictures. He was voiced by vocal artist Mel Blanc. Also listed are the cartoons featuring the earlier character that evolved into Bugs Bunny, as well as those produced after the golden age of American animation.

Bugs Bunny shorts in chronological order by release date

As an unnamed rabbit and as "Bugs" Bunny

As Bugs Bunny 
Note: Every short before "Buckaroo Bugs" is part of the Merrie Melodies series.

Cameo Appearances 
 Naughty Neighbors (1939), as an  Unnamed Rabbit; the only pairing of screwball characters Daffy Duck (???) and Bugs' prototype (???)
 Patient Porky (1940), Bugs' appearance in this short features both his design from A Wild Hare and his voice as an "Unamed Daffy Duck-like Rabbit"
 Crazy Cruise (1942)
 Yankee Doodle Daffy (1943), Bugs is along the pictures in the office
 Porky Pig's Feat (1943), only Black & White appearance of the official Bugs
 A Corny Concerto (1943), with Porky Pig in the segment 'Tales from the Vienna Woods' (also starring Elmer Fudd [as composer] and baby Daffy Duck [in segment 'The Blue Danube'])
 An Itch in Time (1943), seen on a comic book cover (along with Porky Pig) read by Elmer Fudd
 Odor-able Kitty (1945), a cat disguised as a skunk dresses as Bugs to escape the clutches of the male skunk in this cartoon that would later be identified as Pepé Le Pew
 Daffy Doodles (1946), Bugs' face appears in front of a movie theater with a mustache drawn by Daffy Duck
 The Goofy Gophers (1947), Bugs' voice is noticeably sped-up for this brief appearance
 The Lion's Busy (1950), Bugs' head is superimposed on the body of a small gray rabbit shown at the beginning
 Duck Amuck (1953)

Post-golden age media featuring Bugs Bunny

Documentaries 
 Bugs Bunny: Superstar (1975)
 Bugs & Daffy: The Wartime Cartoons (1989)
 Chuck Amuck: The Movie (1991)
 Chuck Jones – Extremes & Inbetweens: A Life in Animation (2000)

Compilation films 
 The Bugs Bunny/Road Runner Movie (1979)
 The Looney Looney Looney Bugs Bunny Movie (1981)
 Bugs Bunny's 3rd Movie: 1001 Rabbit Tales (1982)
 Daffy Duck's Quackbusters (1988)

TV specials 
 Bugs and Daffy's Carnival of the Animals (1976)
 Bugs Bunny's Easter Special (1977)
 Bugs Bunny in Space (1977)
 Bugs Bunny's Howl-oween Special (1978)
 How Bugs Bunny Won the West (1978)
 A Connecticut Rabbit in King Arthur's Court (1978)
 Bugs Bunny's Valentine (1979)
 The Bugs Bunny Mother's Day Special (1979)
 Bugs Bunny's Thanksgiving Diet (1979)
 Bugs Bunny's Looney Christmas Tales (1979)
 Bugs Bunny's Bustin' Out All Over (1980)
 The Bugs Bunny Mystery Special (1980)
 Bugs Bunny: All American Hero (1981)
 Bugs Bunny's Mad World of Television (1982)
 Bugs Bunny/Looney Tunes All-Star 50th Anniversary Special (1986)
 Bugs vs. Daffy: Battle of the Music Video Stars (1988)
 Bugs Bunny's Wild World of Sports (1989)
 Happy Birthday, Bugs!: 50 Looney Years (1990)
 Bugs Bunny's Overtures to Disaster (1991)
 Bugs Bunny's Lunar Tunes (1991)
 Bugs Bunny's Creature Features (1992)
 The 1st 13th Annual Fancy Anvil Awards Show Program Special: Live in Stereo (2002)

TV series 
 The Bugs Bunny Show (1960–2000), compilation series
 Tiny Toon Adventures (1990–1995), voiced by Jeff Bergman, Greg Burson, and Noel Blanc
 Baby Looney Tunes (2001–2006), voiced by Samuel Vincent
 The Looney Tunes Show (2011–2014), voiced by Jeff Bergman
 New Looney Tunes (2015–2020), voiced by Jeff Bergman
 Looney Tunes Cartoons (2020–), voiced by Eric Bauza
 Bugs Bunny Builders (2022), voiced by Eric Bauza
 Tiny Toons Looniversity (2023), voiced by Jeff Bergman

Shorts 
 Box-Office Bunny (1990), voiced by Jeff Bergman (first theatrical Bugs Bunny cartoon since 1964)
 (Blooper) Bunny (Produced: 1991, Released: 1997), voiced by Jeff Bergman
 Yakety Yak, Take it Back (1991), voiced by Jeff Bergman (live-action/animated music video directed by Tim Newman and Michael Patterson, with Melba Moore as herself and the voice of Tibi the Take it Back Butterfly, Dr. John as himself and the voice of Yakety Yak, MC Skat Kat, and Fatz)
 Invasion of the Bunny Snatchers (1992), voiced by Jeff Bergman
 Carrotblanca (1995), voiced by Greg Burson
 From Hare to Eternity (1997), voiced by Greg Burson
 Hare and Loathing in Las Vegas (2004), voiced by Joe Alaskey
 Daffy Duck for President (2004), voiced by Joe Alaskey

Webtoons 
 Toon Marooned (2001), voiced by Billy West
 The Matwix (2001), voiced by Billy West

Feature films 
 Space Jam (1996), voiced by Billy West
 Looney Tunes: Back in Action (2003), voiced by Joe Alaskey 
 Space Jam: A New Legacy (2021), voiced by Jeff Bergman

Direct-to-video 
 Quest for Camelot Sing-A-Longs (1998), voiced by Billy West
 Looney Tunes Sing-A-Longs (1998), voiced by Billy West
 Looney Tunes: Reality Check (2003), voiced by Billy West
 Looney Tunes: Stranger Than Fiction (2003), voiced by Billy West
 Baby Looney Tunes: Eggs-traordinary Adventure (2003), voiced by Samuel Vincent
 Bah, Humduck! A Looney Tunes Christmas (2006), voiced by Billy West
 Looney Tunes: Rabbits Run (2015), voiced by Jeff Bergman
 Teen Titans Go! See Space Jam (2021), voiced by Billy West via archive footage from Space Jam

Other Cameos

Shorts 
 Any Bonds Today?  (1942), a 90-second animated propaganda film for World War II bonds; co-starring Porky Pig and Elmer Fudd
 Jasper Goes Hunting (1944), a Paramount Pictures Puppetoon (a 23-second cameo)
 Gas (1944), a Private Snafu cartoon
 Three Brothers (1944), a Private Snafu cartoon
 Daffy's Rhapsody (2012), appears as a prop

Films 
 Two Guys from Texas (1948), live-action film; Bugs appears briefly in an extended animated dream sequence involving Dennis Morgan and Jack Carson
 My Dream Is Yours (1949), live-action film; Bugs appears in a musical dream sequence alongside Doris Day and Jack Carson (with a cameo by Tweety)
 Daffy Duck's Fantastic Island (1983), compilation film
 Who Framed Roger Rabbit (1988), a Disney/Touchstone film; Bugs appears alongside Mickey Mouse for the first (and only) time
 Gremlins 2: The New Batch (1990), voiced by Jeff Bergman; appears with Daffy at the film's opening (Daffy and Porky also appear during the end credits). A significantly longer version of the Bugs & Daffy sequence is included in the deleted scenes section of the DVD.

TV specials 
 Cartoon All-Stars to the Rescue (1990), voiced by Jeff Bergman
 The Earth Day Special (1990), voiced by Jeff Bergman

TV series 
 Taz-Mania (1991; 1993), voiced by Greg Burson; episodes "A Devil of a Job" and "Wacky Wombat"
 Animaniacs (1993-1994; 1997), voiced by Greg Burson; episodes "Video Review", "The Warners 65th Anniversary Special" and "Back in Style"
 Histeria! (1998), voiced by Billy West; episodes "The Wild West", "The U.S. Civil War - Part II" and "Great Heroes of France"
 Animaniacs (2020), non-speaking appearances in segments "Suspended Animation (Part 2)", and "Suffagette City"

Direct-to-video 
 Tiny Toon Adventures: How I Spent My Vacation (1992), no voice actor
 Tweety's High-Flying Adventure (2000), voiced by Joe Alaskey

References

See also 
 Looney Tunes and Merrie Melodies filmography
 Looney Tunes and Merrie Melodies filmography (1929–1939)
 Looney Tunes and Merrie Melodies filmography (1940–1949)
 Looney Tunes and Merrie Melodies filmography (1950–1959)
 Looney Tunes and Merrie Melodies filmography (1960–1969)
 Looney Tunes and Merrie Melodies filmography (1970–present and miscellaneous)

Bugs Bunny